"After Awhile" is an album by country music singer-songwriter Jimmie Dale Gilmore.  It was released in 1991 as his debut album for Elektra Nonesuch Records.

Critical reception
In The Village Voices annual Pazz & Jop critics' poll for the year's best albums, "After Awhile" placed at number 13.

The Chicago Tribune'''s music critic Greg Kot hailed it as one of the year's best albums and wrote in Trouser Press that "it wasn’t until "After Awhile" that Gilmore's unique style became fully apparent. For the first time, the breadth of his writing is on display...For all the high-minded aspirations in the music, Gilmore never turns into a cosmic cowboy; not for nothing is he fond of quoting Ezra Pound's maxim that 'The poem fails when it strays too far from the song and the song fails when it strays too far from the dance.' The music on "After Awhile" embodies that synergy between heart, intellect and groove."The New Rolling Stone Album Guide praised "After Awhile"'' for "vaulting [Gilmore] into the ranks of some of the Lone Star state's finest troubadours" while observing that the album "finds Gilmore liberated from the strictures of a dancehall stage, free to serve song over form in the spirit of a folk artist rather than an entertainer."

Mark Deming from AllMusic gave the record a 4.5-star rating, calling it "a subtle, unforced masterpiece that captures Gilmore at the subtle peak of his abilities."

Track listing
All songs written by Jimmie Dale Gilmore unless otherwise indicated.

"Tonight I Think I'm Gonna Go Downtown" (Jimmie Dale Gilmore, John Reed) 2:51
"My Mind's Got A Mind Of Its Own" (Butch Hancock) 2:30
"Treat Me Like A Saturday Night" 3:36
"Chase The Wind" 3:07
"Go To Sleep Alone" 3:06
""After Awhile"" 3:33
"Number 16" 2:46
"Don't Be A Stranger To Your Heart" (Jimmie Dale Gilmore, Rick Smith, David Hammond) 3:47
"Blue Moon Waltz" 2:52
"These Blues" 2:19
"Midnight Train" 4:46
"Story Of You" 3:02

Personnel
Jimmie Dale Gilmore - vocals, acoustic guitar
Stephen Bruton - acoustic, electric and slide guitars, mandolin, harmony vocal on "Don't Be A Stranger To Your Heart"
Wes Starr - drums, percussion
Keith Carper - upright bass, electric bass, fretless bass
James Pennebaker - electric guitar, fiddle, steel guitar, dobro
Ponty Bone - accordion on "Go To Sleep Alone"
Richard Bowden - fiddle on "My Mind's Got A Mind Of Its Own," mandolin on "Tonight I Think I'm Gonna Go Downtown"
Bill Ginn - piano on "After Awhile"
Paul Glasse - mandolin on "My Mind's Got A Mind Of Its Own"
Butch Hancock - harmony vocal on "My Mind's Got A Mind Of Its Own"
Tish Hinojosa - harmony vocal on "Go To Sleep Alone"
Teddy Roddy - harmonica on "Midnight Train"
Jesse Taylor - acoustic guitar on "My Mind's Got A Mind Of Its Own" and "Tonight I Think I'm Gonna Go Downtown"
Steve Williams - acoustic guitar on "Chase The Wind," dobro on "My Mind's Got A Mind Of Its Own"

Production
Produced By Stephen Bruton
Associate Producers: Jimmie Dale Gilmore and Dave McNair
Recorded and mixed by Dave McNair at Austin Recording Studios in Austin, Texas, February and March 1991
"My Mind's Got A Mind Of Its Own" and "Tonight I Think I'm Gonna Go Downtown" engineered by James Tuttle

References

1991 albums
Jimmie Dale Gilmore albums
Elektra Records albums